Guy Thomas Ernest Parsons  (6 February 192627 August 2019) was a British accountant, auditor, liquidator and involved in a number of charities.

Charity 
He was involved with the Australian Music Foundation and The Lynn Foundation.

Finance 
He was appointed insolvency chief of Rolls-Royce during their 1971 bankruptcy.

Overseas 
He helped set up Solomon Islands airline SOLAIR as well as the Oman and Yemen electrical board authorities.

Books 
He co-authored Employees' Rights in Receiverships and Liquidations with William Ratford.

Honours 
He was appointed an Officer of the Order of the British Empire (OBE) in the 2016 Birthday Honours, "for services to business and charity.".

References 

1926 births
2019 deaths
Officers of the Order of the British Empire
British accountants